Scrobipalpa kyrana is a moth in the family Gelechiidae. It was described by Povolný in 2001. It is found in China (Xinjiang) and south-eastern Siberia.

References

Scrobipalpa
Moths described in 2001